Bernried am Starnberger See is a municipality in the Weilheim-Schongau district, in Bavaria, Germany. It lies on the shore of Starnberger See.

Gallery

References

Weilheim-Schongau